McIntire is a surname. Notable people with the surname include:

Albert Washington McIntire (1853–1935), US Republican politician
Barbara McIntire (born 1935), American golfer
Carl McIntire (1906–2002), a founder and minister in the Bible Presbyterian Church
Clifford McIntire (1908–1974), US Congressman from Maine
Harry McIntire (John Reid McIntire) (1879–1949), pitcher for the Brooklyn Superbas
Henry McIntire (1835–1863), Union Army officer and lawyer
Jim McIntire, U.S. gunfighter, Texas Ranger in the Old West
John McIntire (1759–1815), founder of the city of Zanesville, Ohio
John McIntire (1907–1991), American character actor (films & Wagon Train)
Lani McIntyre aka Lani McIntire (1904–1951), a Hawaiian guitar and steel guitar player
Lucy Barrow McIntire (1886–1967), American activist, preservationist, actor, and poet
Paul Goodloe McIntire (1860–1952), U.S. stock broker, investor, and philanthropist
Rufus McIntire (1784–1866), U.S. lawyer, congressman
Tim McIntire (1944–1986), American character actor
William Watson McIntire (1850–1912), U.S. Congressman from Maryland

Fictional characters

Molly McIntire, character from the American Girl toy franchise

See also
McIntire, Iowa, city in Mitchell County, Iowa, United States
Herman McIntire House, historic house in Quincy, Massachusetts
McIntire Garrison House, historic house in York, Maine
McIntire Investment Institute, student-run equity fund at the University of Virginia
McIntire–Stennis Act of 1962, for U.S. state agricultural experiment stations and forestry schools
McIntyre (disambiguation)
MacIntyre
Reba McEntire, US actress and country western singer